Gabriele Rangone (of Verona) O.Min.Obs.  (died 27 September 1486) was a Cardinal of the Catholic Church. He was bishop of Eger lat. Agria.

He was made a cardinal on 10 December 1477 by Pope Sixtus IV. Francesco Gandini cites his birth in Chiari, Lombardy.

References

15th-century Italian cardinals
15th-century Italian Roman Catholic bishops
1486 deaths
Year of birth unknown